Arthur Wilbur Henn, (March 8, 1890, in Evansville, Indiana – May 8, 1959, in Winter Park, Florida), was an American ichthyologist and herpetologist. Henn succeeded Carl H. Eigenmann to the position of Curator of Fishes at the Carnegie Museum of Natural History. He was the longest-serving Treasurer in the history of the American Society of Ichthyologists and Herpetologists from 1931 to 1949. He dedicated much of his life to conversation and public education.

Selected taxa author by Henn
 Hemigrammus barrigonae Eigenmann  & Henn, 1914
 Hyphessobrycon ecuadoriensis Eigenmann  & Henn, 1914
 Hyphessobrycon metae Eigenmann  & Henn, 1914
 Neoheterandria Henn, 1916
 Neoheterandria elegans Henn, 1916
 Phalloptychus eigenmanni Henn, 1916
 Phallotorynus Henn, 1916
 Phallotorynus fasciolatus Henn, 1916
 Priapichthys chocoensis (Henn, 1916)
 Priapichthys nigroventralis (Eigenmann  & Henn, 1912)
 Pseudopoecilia fria (Eigenmann  & Henn, 1914)

References

External links
 

American ichthyologists
1890 births
1959 deaths
People from Evansville, Indiana
20th-century American zoologists